Myrmoborus is a genus of passerine birds in the antbird family, Thamnophilidae.

The genus was erected by the German ornithologists Jean Cabanis and Ferdinand Heine in 1860 with the white-browed antbird as the type species. The genus name is a combination of two Greek words: murmos, meaning "ant" and -boros (from "bibros"), meaning "-devouring".

The genus contains five species:

 White-browed antbird (Myrmoborus leucophrys)
 Ash-breasted antbird (Myrmoborus lugubris)
 Black-tailed antbird (Myrmoborus melanurus)
 Black-faced antbird (Myrmoborus myotherinus)
 White-lined antbird (Myrmoborus lophotes)

The white-lined antbird was previously placed in the genus Percnostola but a genetic study published in 2013 found that it is embedded within Myrmoborus.

References

 
Taxonomy articles created by Polbot